The Robert "King" Hooper Mansion, built in 1728, is a historic house in Marblehead, Massachusetts. The oldest section of the mansion was built by candlemaker Greenfield Hooper, and his son, Robert "King" Hooper, expanded the house, adding it's three-story Georgian façade . Hooper made his fortune through the transatlantic fishing business.

It was added to the National Register of Historic Places in 1976, and included in the Marblehead Historic District in 1984.

Marblehead Arts Association
The mansion is currently used by the Marblehead Arts Association as its headquarters. The Association hosts changing exhibits of art and photography for individuals and groups every three months in its six galleries, as well as art classes and community events. The Hooper Mansion also has an Artisan Shop featuring affordable art and gifts.

See also
The Lindens (Washington, D.C.)
National Register of Historic Places listings in Essex County, Massachusetts

References

External links

 Marblehead Arts Association

Houses in Marblehead, Massachusetts
Houses completed in 1728
Arts centers in Massachusetts
Tourist attractions in Essex County, Massachusetts
Houses on the National Register of Historic Places in Essex County, Massachusetts
Individually listed contributing properties to historic districts on the National Register in Massachusetts
1728 establishments in Massachusetts